Winter in the Woods may refer to:
 Winter in the Woods (1936 film), a German drama film
 Winter in the Woods (1956 film), a German drama film, a remake of the above